Jerry Paul Draayer is the Roy P. Daniels Professor of Physics at Louisiana State University. He was elected as a fellow of the American Physical Society, for "enhancing our understanding of collective phenomena in atomic nuclei through algebraic shell-model analyses, statistical spectroscopy studies of strength distributions, explorations involving pseudo-spin symmetry, and the application of nonlinear methods."

References 

Fellows of the American Physical Society
American physicists
Living people
Year of birth missing (living people)